Edward Dean Campbell Buswell (born 16 June 1933) is a male former athlete who competed for England.

Athletics career
He represented England in the 880 yards at the 1958 British Empire and Commonwealth Games in Cardiff, Wales.

Personal life
He married Anne Morton in Blackpool during 1959. Their son Murray Buswell competed in the Aquatics at the 1986 Commonwealth Games.

References

1933 births
Living people
English male middle-distance runners
Athletes (track and field) at the 1958 British Empire and Commonwealth Games
Commonwealth Games competitors for England